The College of Education is one of the undergraduate colleges at Korea University in Seoul, South Korea. It is considered to be one of the leading schools of education in the country.

 Launched in 1972, the College of Education hosts 2,000 would-be-teachers in nine departments. It is a place in which top-tier professors and their students can grow together through teaching and learning. The students can acquire expertise in two professional areas by choosing from multiple, dual, and intensified majors. In addition, the college encourages the development of advanced educational and research activities by collaborating with university institutes that are linked with the departments. The college also operates the Graduate School of Education.

Departments

English Language Education

Korean Language Education

Math Education

Geology Education

History Education

Physical Education

Home Economics Education

Department of Education

Notes

Korea University schools